Grevillea secunda is a species of flowering plant in the family Proteaceae and is endemic to inland Western Australia. It is a spreading shrub with divided leaves, the end lobes cylindrical and sharply pointed, and clusters of pinkish-red flowers  with a red style arranged on one side of the floral rachis.

Description

Taxonomy
Grevillea secunda was first formally described by the botanist Donald McGillivray in 1986 in his book New Names in Grevillea (Proteaceae). The specific epithet (secunda) is a botanical term meaning having flowers or other organs arranged on one side of a branch.

Distribution

Conservation status
Grevillea secunda is classified as "Priority Four" by the Government of Western Australia Department of Biodiversity, Conservation and Attractions, meaning that it is rare or near threatened.

See also
 List of Grevillea species

References

secunda
Proteales of Australia
Eudicots of Western Australia
Taxa named by Donald McGillivray
Plants described in 1986